The Bomb-itty of Errors is a hip hop theatre retelling of Shakespeare's The Comedy of Errors.  Written and performed by Jordan Allen-Dutton, Jason Catalano, GQ, and Erik Weiner, the show has been performed in New York City (Off-Broadway), London (West End), Chicago, Dublin, Edinburgh, Florida, Aspen, Syracuse, Vancouver, Philadelphia, Victoria BC, and Los Angeles.

It was nominated alongside Stephen Sondheim for Best Lyrics at the Drama Desk Awards, nominated for Outer Critics Circle Awards, and received the Jefferson Award in Chicago and the Grand Jury Prize at the HBO US Comedy Arts Festival in Aspen.

The show lasts one hour and thirty minutes and is part play and part rap concert. The four actors play all the characters (male and female), while a DJ spins the beats onstage.  The music was written by JAQ and the show was directed and developed by Andy Goldberg.

References

External links
 Official website
 Samuel French - Bomb-itty

Plays and musicals based on The Comedy of Errors
Off-Broadway musicals
West End musicals
American plays